Frank McNulty may refer to:
Frank Joseph McNulty (1872–1926), one-term Democratic U.S. Representative from New Jersey
Frank McNulty (Colorado politician), Republican member of the Colorado House of Representatives